Carlo Corna (20 August 1891 – 17 June 1964) was an Italian former professional footballer and manager who played as a striker.

He spent his entire career playing for Pro Vercelli, winning five scudetto.

Corna won 8 caps with the Italy national football team.

He was manager of Faenza, Fiorenzuola, and Piacenza.

Honours

Player 
 Pro Vercelli
 Italian Football Championship: 1909, 1910–11, 1911–12, 1912–13, 1920–21

References

External links
 
 

Italian footballers
Italy international footballers
1891 births
1964 deaths
People from Vercelli
Association football forwards